Latrobe Regional Airport (formerly Latrobe Valley Airport)  is located between the Latrobe Valley towns of Morwell and Traralgon, Victoria, Australia.

Users
The airfield was originally located at Morwell and at Moe before moving to the present site. The terminal building contains some displays of aviation artifacts.

The Latrobe Valley Aero Club operates out of Latrobe Regional Airport, providing services to the surrounding community such as Flight Training, Aircraft Rental, Air Charter, Scenic Flights and Air Safari's. Bandicoot Adventure Flights operate vintage and World War II aircraft including Tiger Moths, a T-6 Texan, and a Pitts Special. There is also the Latrobe Flying Museum – its fleet consisting of a CAC Sabre, P-51 Mustang, a Commonwealth Aircraft Corporation Winjeel and a Douglas DC-3. As of 2017 this museum is closed.

GippsAero, manufacturer of the GA200 agricultural aircraft and the GA8 Airvan eight seater passenger aircraft, was based at the airport.

Airlines formerly flying to the airport include Aus-Air, Brindabella Airlines, Hazelton Airlines, and Regional Express Airlines.

Gallery

See also
 List of airports in Victoria

References

External links
Latrobe Regional Airport

Airports in Victoria (Australia)